Ahmed Nabil Khader (born 19 January 1986) is an Egyptian fencer. He competed in the épée events at the 2004 and 2008 Summer Olympics.

References

External links
 

1986 births
Living people
Egyptian male épée fencers
Olympic fencers of Egypt
Fencers at the 2004 Summer Olympics
Fencers at the 2008 Summer Olympics
20th-century Egyptian people
21st-century Egyptian people